"Flashdance" is a song by American electronic music duo Deep Dish with the vocals from Anousheh Khalili. It is a cover of "He's a Dream" by Shandi Sinnamon, from the Flashdance soundtrack. Released in 2004, the song received positive critical reviews and became a hit in several countries, including the United Kingdom, where it debuted and peaked at number three on the UK Singles Chart.

Reception

Critical response
Ben Hogwood of musicOMH was favorable of the song, saying that "Flashdance" has given Deep Dish "a huge worldwide club hit, its full-bodied hook picked up by many a DJ". Hogwood named it the most commercial track on the album, which according to him "loosely follows the lead of its predecessor, teaming moody instrumentals with club based vocal tracks".

The remix "Flashdance (Guetta & Garraud F*** Me I'm Famous Remix)" was nominated to the Grammy Award for Best Remixed Recording, Non-Classical.

Chart performance
For the chart issue dated October 9, 2004, "Flashdance" debuted at number three on the UK Singles Chart, becoming Deep Dish's first and only single to reach the UK top 10. It was the second-highest entry for that week, behind "I Hope You Dance" by Ronan Keating. "Flashdance" peaked at number 14 on the Australian Singles Chart and was certified Gold by the Australian Recording Industry Association, denoting shipments of 35,000 copies.

Track listings

US CD single and digital EP
 "Flashdance" (radio edit) – 4:00
 "Flashdance" (original club mix) – 11:10
 "Flashdance" (Skylark Remix) – 10:44
 "Flashdance" (Raul Rincon Remix) – 7:49
 "Flashdance" (Guetta & Garraud F*** Me I'm Famous Remix) – 9:17
 "Flashdance" (Meat Katie Remix) – 6:35
 "Flashdance" (Meat Katie Dub) – 6:19

UK 12-inch single 1
A1. "Flashdance" (Flashdance club) – 11:12
AA1. "Flashdance" (Meat Katie Remix) – 6:33
AA2. "Flashdance" (Meat Katie Dub) – 6:33

UK 12-inch single 2
A1. "Flashdance" (Skylark Remix) – 10:42
AA1. "Flashdance" (Raul Rincon Remix) – 7:46
AA2. "Flashdance" (Guetta & Garraud F*** Me I'm Famous Remix) – 6:56

UK CD single
 "Flashdance" (radio edit) – 3:13
 "Flashdance" (original club mix—UK radio version) – 7:49
 "Flashdance" (Skylark Remix) – 6:56
 "Flashdance" (Raul Rincon Remix) – 7:46
 "Flashdance" (Guetta & Garraud F*** Me I'm Famous Remix) – 6:56
 "Flashdance" (Meat Katie Remix) – 6:33

Australian CD single
 "Flashdance" (radio edit)
 "Flashdance" (Guetta & Garraud F*** Me I'm Famous Remix)
 "Flashdance" (Skylark Remix)
 "Flashdance" (Meat Katie Remix)
 "Flashdance" (original club mix—UK radio version)

Remix
In 2005 a mashup of "Flashdance" with the Dire Straits song "Money for Nothing" was included on the George Is On album. The remix, titled "Flashing For Money" and arranged by DJ Sultan, appeared as a b-side on Deep Dish Records single releases of "Say Hello", and was released as an a-side single on the Absolute Sound label in France.

Charts and certifications

Weekly charts

Year-end charts

Certifications

Release history

References

2004 singles
2004 songs
Deep Dish (band) songs
Positiva Records singles